Chinampa de Gorostiza is in Veracruz, Mexico.

The municipality of  Chinampa de Gorostiza  is bordered to the south by Tantima and Tuxpam, to the east by Tamiahua and to the north by Tamalín.

It produces principally maize, beans, orange and mango.

In  Chinampa de Gorostiza , in June takes place the celebration in honor to San Antonio de Padua,  Patron of the place. 

The weather in Chicontepec is very warm to hot all year round with rains in summer.

References

External links 

  Municipal Official webpage
  Municipal Official Information

Municipalities of Veracruz